Vladimir Vasilievich Mukhanov (Russian: Владимир Васильевич Муханов; born 20 April 1954) is a Russian football coach. He is the manager of FC Aktobe in Kazakhstan.

Career
He played 37 games in Soviet Top League and scored 6 goals. He started his managerial career in 1992 and managed several Russian First Division teams until 2003, when he came in charge of Kazakhstan Premier League side FC Tobol. Later he won Kazakhstan Cup with FC Astana-1964 in 2005, and the league in 2007 with FC Aktobe. The year 2008 was the most successful season for him, when his team won all three home trophies: League, Cup and Supercup.

On 17 May 2017, Mukhanov resigned as manager of FC Okzhetpes. From 2017 till 2018 he managed FC Aktobe.

Honours 
Zhenis Astana
Kazakhstan Cup (1): 2005
Aktobe
Kazakhstan Premier League (3): 2007, 2008, 2009
Kazakhstan Cup (1): 2008
Kazakhstan Super Cup (2): 2008, 2010

References

1954 births
People from Ramensky District
Living people
Russian footballers
Soviet footballers
Association football forwards
PFC CSKA Moscow players
FC SKA Rostov-on-Don players
FC Fakel Voronezh players
FC Lokomotiv Moscow players
FC Neftekhimik Nizhnekamsk players
Russian football managers
Expatriate football managers in Latvia
Expatriate football managers in Kazakhstan
FC Saturn Ramenskoye managers
FC Sokol Saratov players
Russian expatriate sportspeople in Kazakhstan
FC Neftekhimik Nizhnekamsk managers
FC Lada Dimitrovgrad managers
FC Fabus Bronnitsy managers
FC Chernomorets Novorossiysk managers
FC Tobol managers
FC Astana-1964 managers
FC Aktobe managers
FC Nyva Vinnytsia players
FC Fakel Voronezh managers
FC Khimki managers
FK Liepājas Metalurgs managers
Russian expatriate football managers
Sportspeople from Moscow Oblast